Edward Maalouf (born December 11, 1968 in Hadath, Beqaa Valley, Lebanon) is a Lebanese competitive handcyclist, and the only person to have won medals for Lebanon at the Paralympic Games.

In 1995, while at work, he fell from the sixth floor of a building in Beyrouth, and was left paraplegic.

In 1997, he began to train in disability sports. 

In 2006, he won the handcycle marathon in New York City. 

In 2007, he won a silver medal in the disability cycling world championships in Bordeaux. Later that same year, he won the European Handbike Circuit as well as the Beyrouth Handcycle Marathon.

In 2008, Maalouf both won the International Handcycle Marathon again, and took part for the first time in the Paralympic Games in Beijing as he won 2 bronze medals. This was Lebanon's second participation in the games. Its first, in 2000, had been disappointing. Lebanon had been represented by two sprinters in athletics (T44 category). One, Hussein Ghandour, had been a non-starter in the men's 400m race, while the other, Mahmoud Habbal, had failed to finish his race in the 800m. Lebanon was absent from the 2004 Summer Paralympics, and sent Maalouf as its only competitor to the Beijing Games. To prepare himself, Maalouf underwent intensive training in the Netherlands, and was accompanied by two Dutch coaches to Beijing. He was, unsurprisingly, his country's flag bearer during the opening ceremony. He competed in two events: the time trial and the road race, both in category HC B - B being "for athletes with complete loss of lower limb function and limited trunk stability". In the time trial, he was one of fifteen competitors, and finished third with a time of 22:12.91 - 0.85 seconds behind Vittorio Podesta of Italy. Heinz Frei of Switzerland won gold in 22:06.23. Maalouf had thus won his country's first Paralympic medal. In the road race, he was again one of fifteen competitors, and again won the bronze medal. His time of 1:28:26 was just one second behind Heinz Frei's winning time (1:28:25), and was identical (within a second) to that of silver medallist Max Weber of Germany. Maalouf later said that he had been exhausted during the second race. He went "straight to the hospital" afterwards, and was diagnosed with a blood infection. He then spent four months in hospital. After the games, he also stated that he had received very little support from the Lebanese authorities. He said that they had provided him only with plane tickets and a tracksuit, and he had received no official recognition after his performance, other than congratulations from the Lebanese ambassador to China.

Maalouf participated again in the 2009 International Handcycle Marathon where a striking event took place. During the race, one of his tyres got ruptured, and he had to spend about two minutes replacing it. Nevertheless, Maalouf still managed to come third.

He competed again as Lebanon's sole representative to the 2012 Summer Paralympics in London, taking part in two road cycling events. This time, he did not win a medal. In the men's road race H2 he was lapped and eliminated. In the men's time trial H2, he finished ninth of fourteen, in 30:01.34.

See also
 Lebanon at the Paralympics

External links
 Official website

References

1968 births
Living people
Lebanese male cyclists
Paralympic cyclists of Lebanon
Cyclists at the 2008 Summer Paralympics
Paralympic bronze medalists for Lebanon
Medalists at the 2008 Summer Paralympics
Paralympic medalists in cycling